Daniel Joseph Bohan (November 8, 1941 – January 15, 2016) was a Canadian prelate of the Catholic Church and the Archbishop of the Regina Archdiocese. Prior to his appointment to Regina, Archbishop Bohan was Auxiliary Bishop of Toronto, and a priest in several parishes in New Brunswick.

From 1968 to 1969, Bohan was professor of Moral Theology at Holy Heart Seminary in Halifax, Nova Scotia.

He also has hosted and attended many speaking engagements in the city of Regina. He died of cancer in Regina on January 15, 2016.

References

1941 births
2016 deaths
21st-century Roman Catholic archbishops in Canada
Canadian Roman Catholic theologians
People from Yarmouth, Nova Scotia
Deaths from cancer in Saskatchewan
Roman Catholic archbishops of Regina